The 2018–19 Bangladesh Cricket League was the seventh edition of the Bangladesh Cricket League, a first-class cricket competition. It was held in Bangladesh, starting on 21 November 2018 and concluding on 27 December 2018. South Zone were the defending champions. South Zone retained their title, after they beat North Zone by nine wickets in their final match.

Prior to the start of the tournament, a players' draft took place. The third round match between Central Zone and East Zone finished as a draw, under controversial circumstances. The umpires called off the game due to bad light, eight minutes after the scheduled close, with East Zone six runs short of the target to win.

Points table

Fixtures

Round 1

Round 2

Round 3

Round 4

Round 5

Round 6

References

External links
 Series home at ESPN Cricinfo

2018-19
Bangladesh Cricket League
2018 in Bangladeshi cricket
Bangladeshi cricket seasons from 2000–01